Knight Rider is an American entertainment franchise.

Knight Rider or Knight Riders may also refer to:

Entertainment
Knight Rider (1982 TV series), the original 1980s television series
Knight Rider 2000, a 1991 sequel movie to the 1980s television series
Knight Rider 2010, a 1994 made-for-television movie loosely based on the 1980s series
Team Knight Rider, a 1997 spin-off television series based on the 1980s series
Knight Rider (2008 film), a made-for-television film pilot to the 2008 television series
Knight Rider (2008 TV series), a series following both the 2008 film and the 1980s TV series
Knight Rider (1986 video game), a computer video game
Knight Rider (1988 video game), a Nintendo Entertainment System video game
Knight Rider Special, a 1994 PC-Engine video game released in Japan
Knight Rider: The Game, a 2002 PC and PlayStation 2 video game by Davilex Games

Military
HMMT-164, a US Marine Corps CH-46E Helicopter Training Squadron

Sport 
A group of cricket teams owned by Shahrukh Khan:
Kolkata Knight Riders, a team that plays in the Indian Premier League
Trinbago Knight Riders, a team in the Caribbean Premier League
Trinbago Knight Riders (WCPL), a team in the Women's Caribbean Premier League
Knight Riders (Super Fours), a women's cricket team that competed in the Super Fours
A common nickname for British motorcycle enduro world champion David Knight

See also

Kamen Rider Knight, a character from Kamen Rider Ryuki
Knight Ridder, a former media company in the United States
Knightriders, a 1981 American drama film
Night Rider (disambiguation)